Leigh-Taylor Savannah Smith (born 1986) was Miss New York in 2008.  Prior to this, Smith was Miss Brooklyn, as well as Miss Arlington in Virginia.  Raised in Hampton, Virginia, she graduated from the University of Virginia in 2007.

References

External links
 

1986 births
Living people
People from Hampton, Virginia
University of Virginia alumni
American beauty pageant winners
Miss New York winners
Miss America 2009 delegates